Arthur R.G. Solmssen (September 29, 1928 in New York City – April 23, 2018, Bryn Mawr, Pennsylvania) was an American lawyer and novelist.

History
Arthur R.G. Solmssen spent his early childhood in Berlin, and his adolescence and later youth in the suburbs of Philadelphia. His uncle was German banker Georg Solmssen, his ancestor was the German banker Joseph Mendelssohn. He studied at Harvard University, where he earned his Bachelor of Arts degree in 1950, and the University of Pennsylvania, where he completed his law degree in 1953. He was called to the Pennsylvania Bar in 1953 and commenced working as a lawyer in Philadelphia. His professional affiliation is Of Counsel to Saul Ewing LLP.

Solmssen has published several novels, the most famous of which is A Princess in Berlin (1980). Solmssen received the Athenaeum Literary Award for the novel. A Princess in Berlin is a portrait of the early Weimar Republic, and has been the subject of multiple translations. Solmssen's works are catalogued by the German National Library, among others.

The Comfort Letter, Solmssen's 1975 novel concerning ethics and assurances in public offerings, has been the subject of contemporary academic analysis in law.

Solmssen was a Fellow of the Salzburg Global Seminar, with which he maintained an active association.

He recently finished a book about German Luftwaffe pilot and general officer Ernst Udet.

Solmssen has three sons, Peter York Solmssen, Kurt A. Solmssen, and A.R.G. Solmssen Junior.

Bibliography
 1969 Rittenhouse Square (Hodder & Stoughton)
 1971 Alexander's Feast
 1975 The Comfort Letter (Little, Brown and Company)
 1980 A Princess in Berlin (Little, Brown and Company)
 1986 Takeover Time (Little, Brown and Company)
 2000 The Wife of Shore: A Search

References

External links
 

1928 births
2018 deaths
20th-century American novelists
American male novelists
Pennsylvania lawyers
Lawyers from New York City
German emigrants to the United States
Lawyers from Philadelphia
University of Pennsylvania Law School alumni
Harvard University alumni
20th-century American male writers
Novelists from New York (state)
Writers from New York City
German Lutherans
American Lutherans
20th-century American lawyers
20th-century Lutherans